Hebius sarasinorum, Sarasin’s keelback, is a species of snake of the family Colubridae. The snake is found in Indonesia.

References 

sarasinorum
Reptiles of Indonesia
Reptiles described in 1896
Taxa named by George Albert Boulenger